Erundirapatti is a village in the illuppur taluk of Pudukkottai district, Tamil Nadu, India.

Demographics 

As per the 2001 census, Erundirapatti had a total population of 2856 with 1404 men and 1452 women. The gender ratio was 1.034. The literacy rate was 48.88%

References

Villages in Pudukkottai district